The Khmer–Soviet Friendship Hospital (KSFH;) is a public hospital located in Phnom Penh, Cambodia.  The hospital is managed by the Ministry of Health.

See also
 Ministry of Health (Cambodia)
 Health in Cambodia

References

External links 

Buildings and structures in Phnom Penh
Hospitals in Cambodia
Hospital buildings completed in 1960
Hospitals established in 1960
Cambodia–Soviet Union relations
Soviet foreign aid